The sci.* hierarchy is a major class of newsgroups in Usenet, containing all newsgroups whose name begins with "sci.", organized hierarchically.

sci.* groups discuss various scientific and research issues.

List of sci.* groups

See also
 List of newsgroups

 
Big 8 (Usenet)
Computer-related introductions in 1987